This is a list of decisions of the Supreme Court of the United States that have been explicitly overruled, in part or in whole, by a subsequent decision of the Court.  It does not include decisions that have been abrogated by subsequent constitutional amendment or by subsequent amending statutes.

As of 2018, the Supreme Court had overruled more than 300 of its own cases. The longest period between the original decision and the overruling decision is 136 years, for the common law Admiralty cases Minturn v. Maynard, 58 U.S. (17 How.) 476 decision in 1855, overruled by the Exxon Corp. v. Central Gulf Lines Inc., 500 U.S. 603 decision in 1991. The shortest period is 11 months, for the constitutional law Fourth Amendment (re: search and seizure) cases Robbins v. California, 453 U.S. 420 decision in July 1981, overruled by the United States v. Ross, 456 U.S. 798 decision in June 1982. There have been 16 decisions which have simultaneously overruled more than one earlier decision; of these, three have simultaneously overruled four decisions each: the statutory law regarding habeas corpus decision Hensley v. Municipal Court, 411 U.S. 345 (1973), the constitutional law  Eleventh Amendment (re: sovereign immunity) decision Edelman v. Jordan, 415 U.S. 651 (1974) and the constitutional law Fifth Amendment (re: double jeopardy) decision Burks v. United States, 437 U.S. 1 (1978).

Constitutional

Article One
Commerce Clause

Ex post facto

Federal tax

State import/export tax

Article One courts

Article Three

Compensation Clause

Article Four
Extradition Clause

Equal footing doctrine

Full Faith and Credit

Article Six
Supremacy Clause

First Amendment
Establishment Clause

Free speech clause

Fourth Amendment

Fifth Amendment
Grand jury

Double jeopardy

Self-incrimination

Due process

Takings Clause

Sixth Amendment
Jury right

Confrontation Clause

Right to counsel

Eighth Amendment

Eleventh Amendment

Fourteenth Amendment
Procedural due process

Substantive due process

Equal protection

Citizenship

Statutory

42 U.S.C. § 1983

Antitrust

Arbitration

Federal crime

Habeas

Labor

Common law

Absolute and qualified immunity

Admiralty

Contract

Res judicata

See also
List of abrogated U.S. Supreme Court decisions

References

Further reading
Brandon J. Murrill, The Supreme Court's Overruling of Constitutional Precedent, Congressional Research Service, September 24, 2018.
James F. Spriggs & Thomas G. Hansford, Explaining the Overruling of U.S. Supreme Court Precedent, 63  1091 (2001).

External links
List maintained by the United States Government Printing Office that includes non-explicit overrules

Overruled